Zeenal Kamdar is an Indian Bollywood film actress.

Filmography 
 2016: 7 Hours To Go
 2011: Men Will Be Men as Deepa
 2010: Diwangi Ne Had Kar Di

References

External links
 
 

Year of birth missing (living people)
Living people
Indian film actresses
21st-century Indian actresses
Actresses in Hindi cinema
Actresses from Mumbai